Wayne Thompson may refer to:

 Wayne Thompson (EastEnders), a fictional character
 Wayne Thompson (rugby union) (born 1984), English rugby union player

See also
Wayne Thomson, Canadian politician